The 2016 League of Ireland Premier Division was the 32nd season of the League of Ireland Premier Division. The league began on 4 March 2016 and concluded on 28 October 2016; the relegation play-offs followed on 31 October and 4 November 2016. The prize fund for the SSE Airtricity League Premier and First Divisions was €475,500 for the 2016 season. 

Dundalk were crowned champions for the third year in a row on 23 October after a 2–1 win against Bohemians.

Overview
The Premier Division consisted of 12 teams. Each team played each other three times, a total of 33 matches in the season.

Wexford Youths, the 2015 First Division champion, entered the top level for the first time in their history. Finn Harps were promoted after winning the promotion/relegation playoffs.

The 12 clubs competed for €371,500 in prize money ranging from €110,000 for the winners to €17,000 for the team finishing bottom of the table.

Teams

Personnel and kits

Note: Flags indicate national team as has been defined under FIFA eligibility rules. Players may hold more than one non-FIFA nationality.

League table

Results

Matches 1–22
Teams played each other twice (once at home, once away).

Matches 23–33
Teams played each other once.

Promotion/relegation playoffs
Wexford Youths, the eleventh-placed team from the Premier Division took part in a two-legged play-off against Drogheda United, the winners of the 2016 First Division play-off, to decide who will play in the 2017 Premier Division.

First Leg

Second Leg

Drogheda United are promoted to the 2017 Premier Division; Wexford Youths are relegated to the 2017 First Division.

Top scorers

See also
 2016 FAI Cup
 2016 League of Ireland Cup
 2016 League of Ireland First Division

References

External links
 Official website
 Full Results and Fixtures

 
1
League of Ireland Premier Division seasons
1
Ireland
Ireland